A Little Thing Called First Love is a 2019 Chinese romantic television drama starring Lai Kuan-lin, Zhao Jinmai, Wang Runze, and Chai Wei. Based on the Thai movie "Crazy Little Thing Called Love." (2010)

The series was first aired on Hunan Television from October 23 to November 21, 2019, on Tuesdays, Wednesdays, Thursdays, and Fridays for 36 episodes.

Synopsis
An ordinary girl falls head over heels for the most popular boy in school. Xia Miaomiao is a shy, artistic student who develops a crush on a handsome, talented classmate and embarks on a journey of self-discovery through college. Because of Liang Younian, Xia Miaomiao decides to make a change. Through the help of her friends, she starts to learn about fashion, join school clubs, and studies hard to raise her grades. Her ordinary life becomes more colorful by the day.

Cast     
 Lai Kuan-lin as Liang Younian
A straight A student who majors in architecture. His mom, an excellent architect, died a few years ago. He and Lin Kaituo used to be good friends, but then broke off because Kaituo’s mom married his dad. They reconcile later. He used to think that Miao Miao is just his sister or junior but later realises that he has feelings for Miao Miao. Miao Miao confessed to him first, and he also confessed after. He was given the chance to go to the University of Edinburgh  as an exchange student, but gave up the chance he was offered to work for the project that his mom left off. He and Miao Miao broke up as Miao Miao thinks that he wasn’t honest with her. 1 year later, Miao Miao came back and then they reconciled. His project was finished by then, and he became an excellent architect himself as well.
 Zhao Jinmai as Xia Miao Miao
A normal girl with average looks and grades. Because of her crush on her senior Liang Younian, she decided to change herself. She ended up being a pretty and excellent fashion designer. She looks timid but she can be resolute. She wanted to get better at her drawing skills so she signed up for Liang Younian’s dad who is an art teacher, Liang Gang’s drawing class. She always wanted to study fashion designing but her mom secretly changed her major to architecture in Haicheng University. After that she changed her major to fashion designing as Liang Younian supported her choice. She fell for Liang Younian the second she saw him since their high school days, but she was always shy and wouldn’t confess. When she knew Liang Younian was leaving for Edinburgh, she confessed to him. Liang Younian confessed as well and they became a couple. As the couple didn’t want to be in a long distance relationship, Miao Miao applied to become an exchange student at the University of Birmingham. However, Liang Younian decided to stay to finish his mother’s unfinished project but didn’t know how to explain to Miao Miao, because he didn’t want Miao Miao to give up this amazing opportunity because of him. After she found out about Liang Younian staying, she broke up with him because she thought Liang Younian couldn’t be sincere and honest with her. 1 year later she came back and rejected the confession from her junior Wang Yutian. She reconciled with Liang Younian after he once again confessed to her.
 Wang Runze as Lin Kaituo
Always thought his dad was a great role model. Actually, his dad was obsessed with gambling so his mom divorced his dad. He was good friends with Liang Younian but because his mom and Younian’s dad got married, he broke off with Younian and hated him. They reconciled eventually. He wanted to get better than Liang Younian and was admitted to the architecture department of Haicheng University. He does part time jobs and he never asks his parents for money. He and Miao Miao sat together in high school. He likes Miao Miao and confessed his love to her and Miao Miao rejected him. When He Xin stopped liking him, he realises that he has a crush on He Xin and confesses to her.
 Chai Wei as He Xin
Liang Younian’s younger cousin and Xia Miao Miao’s best friend. Majors journalism at Haicheng University. Has had a crush on Lin Kaituo since she was little. After Lin Kaituo confessed his love to Miao Miao, she kept her distance from Miao Miao and then they both apologised to each other. She stopped liking Lin Kaituo ever since. Lin Kaituo found out that he liked her so he confessed and the two became a couple.

Supporting
 Wang Yimiao as Lin Xia
Xia Miao Miao and He Xin’s best friend. Studies fashion designing at Haicheng University.
 Wang Bowen as Wang Yichao
Liang Younian and Lin Kaituo’s best friend. Studies fashion designing at Haicheng University. Likes Fang Xiaoyue and now is a couple with Fang Xiaoyue. 
 Joe Xu as Lu Peng / Teacher Lu
Xia Miao Miao, Lin Kaituo, and He Xin’s former teacher in high school. Li Si Chen’s nephew. 
 Eva Lu as Jia Yin / Teacher Jia
Teaches fashion design at Haicheng University. Has a crush on Lu Peng but got rejected.
 Damon Xue as Li Ran
Liang Younian’s dormmate.
 Zhu Jintong as Fang Xiaoyue
Studies architecture at Haicheng University. Likes Liang Younian. In other people’s eyes she and Liang Younian were always the perfect match. She is the daughter of the founder of Fang’s Group. When Liang Younian and Xia Miao Miao were together, she decided to move forward. She later gets together with Wang Yichao.
 Chen Kefan as Wang Yutian
Has liked Xia Miao Miao since he saw her at Liang Gang’s drawing class. Studies fashion designing at Haicheng University. When Miao Miao came back from her exchange, he confessed but got rejected.
 Elkie Chong as Yang Man Ling
He Xin’s senior in journalism.
Alex as Wang Fang/ student
 Li Xi Meng as Tang Meng Fei
Studies fashion designing at Haicheng University. Likes Liang Younian. Xia Miao Miao, He Xin, and Lin Xia’s enemy. Cares about her appearance a lot and becomes a model.

Soundtrack
 Chu Lian 初恋 (Theme Song) – Lai Kuan-lin
 Ni Neng Gan Shou Dao Wo De Xin Ma 你能感受到我的心吗 (Ending Song) – Wang Bowen
 Zhu Zai Ni De Xin Zang 住在你的心脏 – Huang Kun [黄鲲]
 Ming Yun 命运 – Li Yiling
 Wo Zhi Neng Li Kai 我只能离开 – Yan Renzhong

References

External links
 

2019 Chinese television series debuts
2019 Chinese television series endings
Hunan Television dramas
Television series about teenagers